Galliate Lombardo is a comune (municipality) in the Province of Varese in the Italian region Lombardy, located about  northwest of Milan and about  southwest of Varese.

Galliate Lombardo borders the following municipalities: Azzate, Bodio Lomnago, Daverio, Varese.

Demographic evolution

References

External links
 www.comune.galliatelombardo.va.it/

Cities and towns in Lombardy